Inked is a tattoo lifestyle digital media company that bills itself as the outsiders' insider media. Covering music, fashion, art, sports and the rest of the lifestyle of the tattooed, Inked, like Vice, has made the transition from the newsstand to digital media company. Tattooed women like Kat Von D, Avril Lavigne, Diablo Cody, Eve and Malin Akerman have appeared on Inked'''s cover. Among the celebrities who have sat down with Inked are Ozzy Osbourne, Tracy Morgan, Slash, Kid Cudi and Billie Joe Armstrong. Inked also covers tattoo artists; they immortalize the best in their Icon feature through which the likes of Don Ed Hardy, Horiyoshi III and Ami James have been honored.

History and profileInked debuted in late 2004 and was published quarterly for one year. In 2006, the magazine was purchased by Downtown Media Group but never published an issue. Pinchazo Publishing Group Inc acquired Inked in August 2007. The company hired creative director Todd Weinberger to redesign the magazine, then brought on editor Jason Buhrmester. Upon Burhmester's departure in the spring of 2010 Rocky Rakovic was tapped as Editor. Rakovic brought in celebrity contributors like Adam Levine, Jessica White and Adam Goldberg. Photographers such as Terry Richardson, Ellen Stagg and Warwick Saint have shot for Inked''.

The company maintains a substantial eCommerce business.

References

External links
Official site
Interview with Inked Creative Director Todd Weinberger at NoD: Notes on Design
Adweek Story on Pin-Up Issue
Cision Interview with Rocky Rakovic
Folio Story on Inked's Breast Cancer initiative
Branding.news Story on Inked's Indian Ink advertorial
Inked gives Buzzfeed editors tattoos
The New York Times talks to Inked's Rocky Rakovic about tattoos
MTV taps Rakovic to dish on celebrity tattoos
CBC talks to Inked editor about Millennials and tattoos
TODAY picks brain on Inked staff about tattoo trends
Newsweek uses Inked as a source on 3D tattoos
The Mirror highlights Inked's feature on Katrina Darling
CBS News uses Inked editor as celebrity tattoo expert
AP story quoting Inked editor Rocky Rakovic about chefs and tattoos

Lifestyle magazines published in the United States
Magazines established in 2004
Media depictions of tattooing
Magazines published in New York City
Project M Group brands